The 2005 ASEAN Club Championship or the 2005 ACC was the second edition of the ASEAN Club Championship, an international association football competition between domestic champion clubs sides affiliated with the member associations of the ASEAN Football Federation. This year, Tampines Rovers FC from Singapore won the championship. The champions of Liga Indonesia (Persebaya Surabaya) apparently did not enter due to a congested fixture list (AFC Champions League, Liga Indonesia and Indonesian Cup). The champions of Laos (MCTPC, aka Telecom and Transportation) and the champions of Philippines (National Capital Region FA) presumably renounced on participation for financial reasons.

Qualified teams

Group stage
Matchday dates are: 22–31 July 2005
Group winners and runners-up qualify for semi-finals

Group A

Group B

Knockout stage

Bracket

Semi finals

3rd Place Playoff
None,  DPMM and  Hoàng Anh Gia Lai are joint third-placers.

Finals

Top scorers

References

Club
ASEAN Club Championship
2005 in Bruneian sport
International association football competitions hosted by Brunei